Senator Rivera may refer to:

Cirilo Tirado Rivera (born 1964), Senate of Puerto Rico
Eric Correa Rivera (born 1975), Senate of Puerto Rico
George Rivera (born 1948), Colorado State Senate
Gustavo Rivera (politician) (born 1975), New York State Senate
Luis A. Berdiel Rivera (born 1962), Senate of Puerto Rico
Luis Daniel Rivera, Senate of Puerto Rico
Luis Muñoz Rivera (senator) (1916–2006), Senate of Puerto Rico
Luis Padrón Rivera (1892–1960), Senate of Puerto Rico